Choy may refer to:

People
Choy, Cantonese Chinese or version of Cai (surname)
Choy, a Malayalee surname, sometimes spelled as Choyee or Choyi

Arts, entertainment, and media
CHOY-FM, a radio station in Moncton, New Brunswick, Canada
CHOY-TV, a defunct TV station in Saint-Jérôme, Quebec, Canada

See also
 Bok choy
Cai (disambiguation)
Choi (disambiguation)
Chōyō, Kumamoto, village in Aso District, Kumamoto of Japan
Choysky District, Altai Republic of Russia
Tsoy (disambiguation)